Lepidochrysops australis, the southern blue, is a butterfly of the family Lycaenidae. It is found in South Africa, from the above Greyton and Caledon along the coastal ranges to the Eastern Cape.

The wingspan is 32–36 mm for males and 33–40 mm for females. Adults are on wing from November to March. There is one or possibly two generations per year.

The larvae feed on Selago species.

References

Butterflies described in 1964
Lepidochrysops
Endemic butterflies of South Africa